Červeník is a village and municipality in Hlohovec District in the Trnava Region of western Slovakia.

History
In historical records the village was first mentioned in 1113. The first known name of the village was "Bin", it was changed to "Wereswar" in 1394, in 1661 to "Veresvar", and in 1911 it was Vorosvar (which means "Red Castle" in Hungarian). In 1920 Vorosvar was changed to the "Slovak-like" name Veresvar nad Vahom (Verešvár nad Váhom) and finally, in 1948 to Červeník.

Geography
The municipality lies at an altitude of 147 metres and covers an area of 9.939 km². It has a population of about 1560 people (30.04.2008).

Genealogical resources

The records for genealogical research are available at the state archive "Statny Archiv in Banska Bystrica, Nitra, Slovakia"

 Roman Catholic church records (births/marriages/deaths): 1666-1911 (parish B)

See also
 List of municipalities and towns in Slovakia

References

External links
 www.cervenik.sk
http://www.statistics.sk/mosmis/eng/run.html
Surnames of living people in Cervenik

Villages and municipalities in Hlohovec District